That's My Story is a 1937 American drama film directed by Sidney Salkow from a screenplay by Barry Trivers. The film stars William Lundigan, Claudia Morgan, and Herbert Mundin.

Cast list
 William Lundigan as Howard Fields
 Claudia Morgan as Janet Marlowe
 Herbert Mundin as Hiram
 Hobart Cavanaugh as Sheriff Otis
 Bernadene Hayes as Bonnie Rand
 Eddie Garr as Jenks
 Ralph Morgan as B. K. Carter
 Harlan Briggs as Sheriff Allen
 Edward Gargan as John
 Henry Hunter as Foster
 Charles Wilson as Cummings
 Charles Trowbridge as B. L. Martin
 Sam Hayes as Announcer
 Murray Alper as Blackie

References

External links
 
 
 

1937 drama films
1937 films
American drama films
Films directed by Sidney Salkow
Universal Pictures films
American black-and-white films
1930s American films
1930s English-language films